Petrus Olai is a latinization of Peder (Per)  Olsson (Olsen) or  Olofsson, used by a number of early modern Scandinavian authors:
Petrus av Alvastra (Petrus Olavi), c. 1307–1390, prior of  Vadstena monastery, Swedish author and translator
Petrus Olai (Peder Olsen), ca. 1490–ca. 1570,   Danish Franciscan friar and historiographer
Petrus Olai Dalekarlus (1601–1680), Swedish pastor and politician.
Petrus Fontelius (Petrus Olai Fontelius Uplandiensis), 1622–1684, Swedish mathematician, rector of Uppsala university and politician.
Petrus Stjernman (Petrus Olai Stjernman), 1642–1692,   bishop of Visby.